Séamus Francis Egan (1 December 1923 – 23 January 2004) was an Irish judge and barrister who was a judge of the Supreme Court of Ireland between 1991 and 1995. He previously practiced a barrister, before becoming a judge of the High Court in 1984. He died in 2004.

Early life 
Egan was born in 1923 in Dublin to James Egan and Christian O'Donnell. He attended Blackrock College and received a degree from University College Dublin. He attended the King's Inns to train to become a barrister.

Legal career 
He was called to the bar in 1945 and became a senior counsel in 1962. He spent the early part of his career practising on the Western Circuit.

Between 1963 and 1964 he acted for Gladys Ryan in the case of Ryan v. The Attorney General, challenging the constitutionality of the fluoridation of water in Ireland. Though she was unsuccessful, the case established the right to bodily integrity under the Constitution of Ireland and developed the principles of unenumerated rights. In 1979 he represented Francis McGirl who was acquitted of the murder of Louis Mountbatten.

Judicial career

High Court 
He made his judicial declaration of office to become a judge of the High Court on 2 July 1984. 

In addition to his duties in the High Court, he began presiding over trials in the Special Criminal Court in 1988.

Supreme Court 
Egan was appointed to the Supreme Court of Ireland in 1991. He was one of five judges who decided Attorney General v. X in 1992, allowing the appeal of the girl, and in 1995 he issued a dissenting opinion in Re. a Ward of Court where he held that the removal of a tube providing food to a woman would be equivalent to killing her. He also wrote a dissent in a case involving Patricia McKenna challenging the constitutionality of the government's campaigning for the Fifteenth Amendment of the Constitution of Ireland.

He retired on 30 November 1995. He was replaced by Donal Barrington.

Hepatitis C Compensation Tribunal 
Following his retirement, he was appointed to chair the Hepatitis C Compensation Tribunal.

Personal life 
Egan was married to Ada Leahy with whom he had seven children. He built a house on Shrewsbury Road which he sold in 1989. He died in January 2004 at the age of 80. His removal was attended by the Chief Justice Ronan Keane, the Attorney General Rory Brady and the aide-de-camp to the President.

References

Works cited

1923 births
2004 deaths
People from County Dublin
Irish barristers
People educated at Blackrock College
Alumni of University College Dublin
Alumni of King's Inns
High Court judges (Ireland)
Judges of the Supreme Court of Ireland
20th-century Irish judges
20th-century Irish lawyers